Pseudochazara euxina is a species of butterfly in the family Nymphalidae. It is endemic to Crimea. Its natural habitats are temperate forests and temperate grassland. It is threatened by habitat loss.

References

 Satyrinae of the Western Palearctic – Pseudochazara euxina
Pseudochazara euxina on Global Biodiversity Information Facility
Pseudochazara euxina on BioLib.cz

euxina
Taxonomy articles created by Polbot
Butterflies described in 1909